The Roman Catholic Diocese of Azul is in Argentina and is a suffragan of the Archdiocese of La Plata.

History
On 20 April 1934, Pope Pius XI established the Diocese of Azul from the Diocese of La Plata.  In 1957 territory was taken from this diocese to form the Diocese of Nueve de Julio.

Bishops

Ordinaries
César Antonio Cáneva (1934–1953)
Antonio José Plaza (1953–1955), appointed Archbishop of La Plata
Manuel Marengo (1956–1982)
Emilio Bianchi di Cárcano (1982–2006) 
Hugh Manuel Salaberry, S.J. (2006–present)

Auxiliary bishops
Antonio José Plaza (1950–1953), appointed Bishop here
Emilio Bianchi di Cárcano (1976–1982), appointed Bishop here

Territorial losses

References

Azul
Azul
Azul
Azul
Azul, Buenos Aires